Oplerclanis rhadamistus is a moth of the family Sphingidae. It is known from lowland forest and heavy woodland from Senegal to Angola, the Congo and western Uganda.

The length of the forewings is 27–30 mm for males.

References

Smerinthini
Moths described in 1781
Moths of Africa